Ybyrapora diversipes is a species of spider in the family Theraphosidae found in Brazil.

References

Theraphosidae
Spiders described in 1842
Spiders of Brazil